Robert "Roby" Monroe is an American soccer player, who formerly played for the Denver Dynamite in the Professional Arena Soccer League.

References

Living people
Professional Arena Soccer League players
American soccer players
Association footballers not categorized by position
Year of birth missing (living people)